Étang de Lers or Lake of Lers is a natural lake in the Ariège department (France).

Geology

Lherzolite, an ultramafic rock, has its type locality at Étang de Lers. The name is derived from the old spelling "Étang de Lherz".

References

Lers